Enterprise Township is one of fifteen townships in Valley County, Nebraska, United States. The population was 105 at the 2020 census. A 2021 estimate placed the township's population at 105.

See also
County government in Nebraska

References

External links
City-Data.com

Townships in Valley County, Nebraska
Townships in Nebraska